The  or Nihon Ryakuki (1596) (An Abbreviated Record of Japan) is a chronicle of the history of Japan. It mentions the kitsune.

See also
 Nihon Shoki

References

External links
 Manuscript scans, Waseda University Library

History books about Japan